Franz "Franky" Schiemer (born 21 March 1986, in Haag am Hausruck, Upper Austria) is a former Austrian footballer who played as a defender and was most recently assistant head coach of Leeds United.

Career

Club career
He started his career in his hometown Taufkirchen an der Pram as striker. Schiemer came through the youth ranks at SV Ried to make his professional debut in the 2003/2004 season at just 17 years of age. The same year he was 3rd in the U17-European Championship. In 2005, he joined Austria Wien. On 9 April 2009 FC Red Bull Salzburg has for the season 2009/2010 Schiemer from league rivals FK Austria Wien required, the 23-year-old Austria national team player signed with the Red Bulls a contract until 30 June 2012.

He won the Austrian Football Bundesliga two times, once with Austria Wien (2006) and once with FC Red Bull Salzburg (2010).

International career
He made his debut for Austria in October 2007 against Switzerland but was overlooked for the EURO 2008 squad. He has earned 18 caps and 4 goals scored (on 1 August 2008).

Retirement and coaching career
On 1 January 2015, Schiemer announced his retirement from football after an injury plagued career  and became assistance coach with FC Liefering. On 13 February 2017, Schiemer was appointed as the new sports director of SV Ried.

On 2 April 2018, head coach Lassaad Chabbi was on leave and Schiemer was appointed interim as head coach, until he was replaced by Thomas Weissenböck on 18 April 2018. On 7 June 2018, Schiemer was confirmed in his position as sporting director of SV Ried. On 14 November 2018, Schiemer announced his resignation

For the 2019/20 season he became Jesse Marsch's assistant coach at FC Red Bull Salzburg.

International goals

Honours
Austrian Football Bundesliga (4):
 2006, 2010, 2012, 2014
Austrian Cup (4):
 2007,2009, 2012, 2014
U17-European Championship 2003
 3rd

References

External links
Profile at FK-Austria.at
Player profile - Austria Archive

 - Guardian Football

1986 births
Living people
People from Grieskirchen District
Austrian footballers
Austria international footballers
Austria youth international footballers
Austria under-21 international footballers
SV Ried players
FK Austria Wien players
FC Red Bull Salzburg players
Austrian Football Bundesliga players
Association football defenders
Footballers from Upper Austria
Austrian football managers
SV Ried managers
Leeds United F.C. non-playing staff